Northern Rovers Football Club is an amateur football club based in Glenfield, New Zealand.

Formed in 2020 as an amalgamation between Glenfield Rovers and Forrest Hill-Milford United, Northern Rovers men's team currently competes in the NRFL Championship, 
while the women's team competes in the NRFL Premiership which is part of the qualifying leagues for the New Zealand Women's National League.

The club also competes in both the Chatham and Kate Sheppard Cups, New Zealand's premier knockout tournaments for men and women. Both teams received byes in the 2021 Chatham Cup and 2021 Kate Sheppard Cup for the preliminary and first round, along with other ranked teams. The men got their first win of the Chatham Cup when they beat West Hamilton 4–0, however they were deemed to have fielded an ineligible player and the result was overturned. The women's team won their first game 9–1 over Onehunga Sports in the Kate Sheppard Cup.

Current squad

References

External links
Club website
Soccerway profile

Association football clubs in Auckland
2020 establishments in New Zealand